The 50 kilometre cross-country skiing event was part of the cross-country skiing programme at the 1960 Winter Olympics, in Squaw Valley, California, United States. It was the fifth appearance of the event at its length of 30 km. The competition was held on Saturday, February 27, 1960 at the McKinney Creek Stadium.

Kalevi Hämäläinen of Finland won the gold medal ahead of fellow Finn Veikko Hakulinen. Defending Olympic champion Sixten Jernberg from Sweden finished 5th. Thirty nine competitors were due to start but eight did not make the starting line. Of the top 14, only 2 were not Nordic.

Results

References

External links
1960 Squaw Valley Official Olympic Report

Men's cross-country skiing at the 1960 Winter Olympics
Men's 50 kilometre cross-country skiing at the Winter Olympics